Terry Acebo Davis (born 1953) is a Filipino American artist and nurse based in the San Francisco Bay Area. Her art is thematically linked to her family and her origins as a Filipino American.

Early life and education 
Born in Oakland, California, the oldest of six children, Acebo Davis gained a Bachelor of Science in Nursing from California State University, Hayward in 1976, followed by graduate coursework in Pediatric Oncology at the University of California, San Francisco. In 1991 she was awarded a Bachelor of Fine Arts by San Jose State University, followed by an MFA in 1993.

Rather than become a full-time artist, Acebo Davis chose to balance making art with work as a professional nurse, serving as a Pediatric Critical Care Transport Specialist at Stanford Medical Center.

Jan Rindfleisch writes, "Acebo Davis has bridged worlds in multiple ways. As a Filipino American growing up in Fremont, she had come with her family often to Japantown to buy rice. As an artist and graduate of SJSU, she chose to live in Palo Alto, a midpoint between the arts centers of San Jose, San Francisco, and Oakland."

Career

Artistic themes and works 
Acebo Davis's art is heavily rooted in her origins as a Filipino American, her family, and racial strife and collision. Dahil Sa Yo, her "seminal work", features repetitive images of her mother set behind multiple boxes of shoes, drawing on the public persona of Imelda Marcos. The repetition of the image serves to emphasize the importance of her mother and other women of her generation, who "held together their families and looked after their home" as immigrants.

About her artwork Phoebe Farris writes, "Acebo Davis’ ability to not only manage but lucidly express her complex identity of Filipino American printmaker/mixed-media artist/lecturer/nurse that fuels her highly meditative work. . . Acebo Davis presents to her viewers visual mantras, simultaneously pleasing in their careful compositions yet hauntingly thought-provoking in their subject matter.”

Benjamin Pimentel of the San Francisco Chronicle states “The marks she makes chronicle her many journeys an Asian American woman, a caregiver and an artist.”

Community engagement 
Acebo Davis has served as Chairwoman of the Palo Alto Public Art Commission; as a Trustee for Arts Council Silicon Valley; Board President and Advisor for WORKS/San Jose.

She is a member of the DIWA Filipino artists' collective, and regularly lectures on the Filipino identity, including lectures at the Smithsonian Institution, the University of Pennsylvania and Mills College.

Awards and distinctions 
In 1997 she was awarded the James D. Phelan Award by Kala Art Institute, along with the Radius Award of the Palo Alto Art Center. The same year, she participated in the exhibition Families: Rebuilding, Recreating, Reinventing curated by Flo Oy Wong at the Euphrat Museum of Art.

Acebo Davis received an artist residency at the Frans Masereel Centre in Kasterlee, Belgium in 1998.

In 2003, Acebo Davis was awarded one of the three annual Arts Council Silicon Valley Fellowships.

In 2004 she became the first Filipino American to exhibit art at the Asian Art Museum of San Francisco's Samsung Hall, where her piece Tabing Rising, visually describing her family's immigration to the United States in 1945, was displayed in 2004.

Exhibitions

Solo exhibitions 
1998      New Work, Washington Square Gallery, San Francisco, CA
1996      Of the Body, Boom Gallery, Honolulu, HI
1995      Cantho into Haarlem: New Works, Richard Sumner Gallery, Palo Alto, CA
1993      Redefining Self: The Flip Side, San Jose State University, San Jose, CA

Group exhibitions 
1998      San Francisco Babaylan, Museo Ng Maynila, Manila, Philippines; Balikbayan Box: Tracing a Strain with DIWA Arts, Bronx Museum, NY; Seino Ka? ano Ka? Fine Art Gallery, San Francisco State University, CA
1997      Respect Diversity, Mountain View City Hall, Mountain View, CA; Families: Rebuilding, Reinventing, Recreating, Euphrat Museum, Cupertino, CA; Mulicultural Perspectives, Koret Gallery, Palo Alto, CA; Bay Area's Diversity in Art, Synopsis, Inc. Office, Mountain View, CA
1996     Alexander Gerbode Foundation, Capp Street Project, San Francisco, CA; Memories of Overdevelopment: Philippine Diaspora in Contemporary Visual Art, University of California at Irvine; Kayumanggi Presence '96, East-West Gallery, University of Hawaii, Honolulu, HI
1995 Biennial Print Competition and Exhibition, Triton Art Museum, Santa Clara, CA; 13th Annual National Juried Exhibition, Los Angeles Printmaking Society, Loyola Marymount University, Los Angeles, CA; Filipinas in Hawaii, The Philippine Consulate General, Honolulu, HI; Artists Respond to Proposition 187, San Jose Center for Latino Arts, San Jose, CA
1994 Yellow Forest, SOMAR Gallery, San Francisco, CA; Making Women Artists Visible, Galería Tonantzin, San Juan Bautista, CA; Bay Area Artists, Galerie Adlergasse, Dresden, Germany; Día de Los Muertos, Yerba Buena Center for the Arts, San Francisco, CA
1993 Works on Paper, Berkeley Art Center, Berkeley. CA; Object as Identity, 1078 Gallery, Chico, CA; Printmakers, Walter Bischoff Gallery-Amerikahaus, Stuttgart, Germany; American Exhibition, Stuttgart International Airport, Stuttgart, Germany; Kayumanggi Presence, Academy Art Center at Linekona, Honolulu, HI; Time Echoes, C. N. Norman Gallery, University of California, Davis
1992 Harmony of Cultures, Bingham Gallery, San Jose, CA
1991 New Printmakers Invitational, California State University, Long Beach

References

Bibliography

External links
 

1953 births
American artists of Filipino descent
American nurses
American women nurses
Artists from Oakland, California
California State University, East Bay alumni
Living people
San Jose State University alumni
21st-century American women